The women's shot put event at the 2019 African Games was held on 30 August in Rabat.

Results

References

Shot